The four  were light cruisers operated by the Imperial Japanese Navy. All were named after Japanese rivers. Larger than previous Japanese light cruisers, the Agano-class vessels were fast, but with little protection, and were under-gunned for their size (albeit with a powerful offensive torpedo armament, able to launch up to eight Type 93 "Long Lance" torpedoes in a salvo). They participated in numerous actions during World War II.

The Agano class was followed by the larger , of which only a single vessel was completed.

Background
The Imperial Japanese Navy had developed a standardized design for light cruisers as flagships for destroyer and submarine squadrons, based on a 5,500 ton displacement, shortly after World War I. However, by the 1930s these vessels were obsolete, as contemporary destroyers were faster, carried more powerful armament, and had greater endurance. These vessels were intended to be the flagships for six destroyer squadrons and seven submarine squadrons. The new design was finalised in October 1937; however, construction was delayed due to overloading of the Japanese shipyards. Construction costs came to 16.4 million yen per vessel.

Design and description
The design for the Agano class was based on technologies developed for the light cruiser , resulting in a graceful and uncluttered deck line and single funnel. Unlike most Japanese designs, the Agano class was not overweight, so it exhibited good stability and seaworthiness. The ships had a crew of 51 officers and 649 enlisted men; assignment as a flagship added 6 officers and 20 more sailors.

The Agano class had four geared steam turbines, each driving a single propeller shaft, using steam provided by six Kampon Ro Gō water-tube boilers.

Armament and protection
The main armament of the Agano class consisted of six  41st Year Type guns in three twin-gun turrets, two in front of the superstructure and one aft. The secondary armament included four  98th Year Type anti-aircraft (AA) guns in two twin turrets amidships. The suite of light anti-aircraft weapons included a pair of triple mounts for  Type 96 AA guns and two twin-gun mounts for  Type 93 anti-aircraft machineguns. The ships also had two quadruple torpedo launchers for  Type 93 (Long Lance) torpedoes on the centerline and had a reload system with eight spare torpedoes. The Agano-class ships were also fitted with a pair of Aichi E13A floatplanes and a catapult. The first two vessels in the class (Agano and Noshiro) had a larger  catapult, while the later Yahagi and Sakawa had a shorter 19-meter catapult. To detect submarines, the Aganos were equipped with a Type 93 Model 2 hydrophone installation and a Type 93 Model 3 sonar. They were equipped with two depth charge chutes for 18 depth charges.

It was originally supposed to equip them with nine 155mm guns in three triple turrets like those used in their successor, triple torpedo tubes and no 8cm guns, but the triple 155mm turrets were too large for the ships. Therefore the main battery was changed to four twin 152mm turrets. Then it was decided to strengthen the torpedo armament, so number three turret was removed, and the weight saved went into quad torpedo tubes, the 8cm guns and extra light antiaircraft guns.

The ships' magazines were enclosed in armored boxes with  sides, 20-millimeter tops and 20- or 25-millimeter ends.

All of the vessels in the class were updated with additional anti-aircraft weaponry and radar at various points in their service lives.

Ships in class
Four ships were budgeted under the 1939 4th Naval Replenishment Programme, three from the Sasebo Naval Arsenal and one from Yokosuka Naval Arsenal.

Agano 

Completed on 31 October 1942, Agano participated in the battles for Guadalcanal and the Solomon Islands during 1943. Ordered to home waters for repair, she was torpedoed and sunk north of Truk by the US submarine , on 16 February 1944.

Noshiro 

Commissioned on 30 June 1943, Noshiro participated in operations in the Solomon Islands and was damaged during the US carrier aircraft raids on Rabaul on 5 November 1943. She served in the Marianas in the summer of 1944, and was part of Admiral Kurita's force during the Battle of the Philippine Sea. At the Battle of Leyte Gulf in October 1944.

Yahagi 

Commissioned on 29 December 1943 Yahagi saw action in the Marianas in May/June 1944, during the Battle of the Philippine Sea, and during the Battle of Leyte Gulf. After the US invasion of Okinawa on 1 April 1945, she was ordered to accompany the battleship  on its suicide mission against the American fleet at Okinawa. Yahagi was hit by some seven torpedoes as well as a dozen bombs, and sank on the afternoon of 7 April 1945.

Sakawa 

Sakawa was not completed until the end of 1944, by which time there was little fuel available.  She survived the war unscratched and was used as a transport to return demilitarized troops from New Guinea and other areas after the war. She was expended in the atom bomb tests at Bikini Atoll in 1946.

References

Sources

External links

 The Agano-class light cruisers on Materials of the IJN

Cruiser classes